Sidiki Diarra (6 January 195226 June 2014) was a former Burkinabé footballer, and football manager who coached the Burkina Faso national team.

Death
Diarra died on 26 June 2014, after a long bout of illness with a left hemiplegia.

References

External links
NFT Profile

1952 births
People from Bobo-Dioulasso
Burkinabé footballers
Burkina Faso international footballers
Burkinabé football managers
Burkina Faso national football team managers
Burkinabé Premier League players
Association football goalkeepers
2014 deaths
21st-century Burkinabé people